Lull may refer to:
In economy
 recession
In music
Lull (band), a musical project by Mick Harris.
Lull (EP), an EP by the Smashing Pumpkins
"Lull", a song by Radiohead, a B-side to "Karma Police"
Auburn Lull, an American dream pop / space rock group
People
Saint Lullus (c.710–786), English bishop, also referred to as Lull or Lul
Edward P. Lull, Commander of Alaska, USA, in 1881
Richard Swann Lull (1867–1957), American palaeontologist
Timothy Lull (1943–2003), American Lutheran minister and scholar
Ramon Llull, philosopher
Arthur de Lull (or de Lulli), pseudonym of Euphemia Allen
Other 
Lull, a brand of reach forklift built by JLG Industries